The men's double York round was one of three archery events on the archery at the 1908 Summer Olympics programme. Arrows were shot in ends, or groups, of three. The archers shot a total of 288 arrows each over the two rounds of 144. The competition was held on Friday, 17 July and Saturday, 18 July, with one round each day. The archers had to contend with significant rain and wind on the first day and gusts of wind on the second.

William Dod won the competition to best his sister Lottie Dod's result; she won the silver medal in the women's competition. Dod's victory was "pretty clear" by the end of the 80-yard portion of the second round, with him having established a significant lead with only 24 arrows left at 60 yards. The United States' only archer won a bronze medal in this competition, preventing Great Britain from sweeping this event as they did the women's competition and France did the Continental-style event. Henry B. Richardson had the best single-round score of the competition (417 in the second round) but had been well behind the leaders after the first round. Despite starting the second day 50 points behind Reginald Brooks-King, Richardson nearly caught the other man for second place with 3 arrows remaining (down only 1 point, 749 to 748) before Brooks-King pulled away again on the last end, 19–12, for a "close and exciting finish." Ten French archers competed in the York round, though none did better than 16th place.

Twenty-seven archers from three nations competed. Five additional archers (4 from France, 1 from the United States) entered but did not start. NOCs were limited to 30 competitors each, though none came close to this maximum.

Background
This was the second and final appearance of the event, which was previously held in 1904.

Dod was not favoured. Reginald Brooks-King had won five British national titles since 1900 (1900, 1902, 1903, 1906, and 1908), with John Penrose, John Bridges, Eyre Hussey (not competing at the London Games), and Hugh Nesham each taking one of the remaining four.

Competition format

Three arrows were shot per end. Each hit was worth 9, 7, 5, 3, or 1 points depending on which ring was hit; an arrow touching two rings would count as hitting the higher value. Ties were broken first by number of hits, then by score at the longest range (100 yards), then by hits at the longest range.

Schedule 
The double York round event was held on the first two days of the archery schedule, along with the women's double National round.

Results

References

Sources
 Official Report of the Games of the IV Olympiad (1908).
 De Wael, Herman. Herman's Full Olympians: "Archery 1908". Accessed 8 April 2006.

Men's York round
Men's events at the 1908 Summer Olympics